Dadaruhi is the second album by the Turkish band Replikas. The album was released by Ada Muzik in 2002.
 
Dadaruhi can be described both as an instinctive outcome and the antithesis of Koledoyuran. The main attribute of  the album is that the musical forms that were under focus have naturally blended into one another and none of them are predominant. Sampling technology was involved in the composing process, which provided the tracks with a  varied and contemporary touch and enabled a more liberated use of sounds. Studio technology was not ruled out; the pure and unprocessed experience inherent in Koledoyuran was substituted by an effort to create an integrated album in atmosphere and sound. The album enjoyed contributions from a variety of guests and includes traditional instruments like ney (reed flute), zurna (shrill pipe), strings, and the Ramadan drum, as well as vocalists and a text-reading chorus. 
The lyrics were not written to make up a concept album but are in natural harmony and mirror the human inner world through personal impressions. Death, childhood, old age and mental disorders are the main themes of the album.

In 2013, a remastered version of the album is released.

Track listing
 Kemir Beni
 Kör Taşın Kıyısında
 Haydi Bir Ses Duy
 . (Nokta)
 Hacıyatmaz
 Yaş Elli
 Deli Halayı
 Karabasan
 Bir Bağlam Roka
 Ş
 Ömür Sayacı
 Keşif
 Tabu

Line up
Gökçe Akçelik
Selçuk Artut
Orçun Baştürk
Barkın Engin

2002 albums
Replikas albums